Electrochemical energy conversion is a field of energy technology concerned with electrochemical methods of energy conversion including fuel cells and photoelectrochemical. This field of technology also includes electrical storage devices like batteries and supercapacitors. It is increasingly important in context of automotive propulsion systems. There has been the creation of more powerful, longer running batteries allowing longer run times for electric vehicles.These systems would include the energy conversion fuel cells and photoelectrochemical mentioned above.

See also
Bioelectrochemical reactor
Chemotronics
Electrochemical cell
Electrochemical engineering
Electrochemical reduction of carbon dioxide
Electrofuels
Electrohydrogenesis
Electromethanogenesis
Enzymatic biofuel cell
Photoelectrochemical cell
Photoelectrochemical reduction of CO2

Notes

External links
International Journal of Energy Research
MSAL 
NIST
scientific journal article
Georgia tech

Electrochemistry
Electrochemical engineering
Energy engineering
Energy conversion
Biochemical engineering